Romanelli is a family name of Italian origin. The 1990 Census found that Romanelli was the 21,280th most common surname in the United States. 

Some people named Romanelli include:
Carl Romanelli (politician), a Green Party activist in Pennsylvania
Carl Romanelli (sculptor), a Los Angeles-born American sculptor
Carlo Romanelli, an Italian-born American sculptor
Chris Romanelli, a musician
Eugenia Romanelli, (born 1972) Italian author and journalist
Giovanni Francesco Romanelli, an Italian Baroque painter in Rome
Pasquale Romanelli, an Italian sculptor from Florence
Pietro Romanelli, an Italian archaeologist
Raffaello Romanelli, an Italian sculptor from Florence
Roland Romanelli, a French musician and arranger
Romano Romanelli, an Italian sculptor from Florence
Samuel Romanelli, an Italian Jewish traveler and man of letters

Surnames